The 2009 Norton 360 Sandown Challenge was the seventh race meeting of the 2009 V8 Supercar Championship Series. It contained Races 13 and 14 of the series and was held on the weekend of 1–2 August at Sandown Raceway, in Melbourne, Victoria, Australia.

Entry list

References

External links
Official series website
Official timing and results

Norton 360 Sandown Challenge
Motorsport at Sandown
August 2009 sports events in Australia